Abraxas formosilluminata is a species of moth belonging to the family Geometridae. It was described by Hiroshi Inoue in 1984. It is known from Japan and Taiwan.

References

Abraxini
Moths of Japan
Moths of Taiwan
Moths described in 1984